WDCR (1340 AM) was a radio station broadcasting an oldies format during the day, and a variety format at night. Licensed to Hanover, New Hampshire, United States, the station served the Hanover and greater Upper Valley area. The station carried broadcasts of several Dartmouth College sports teams in association with the Dartmouth Sports Network, a division of Dartmouth Broadcasting. The station's license was held by the Board of Trustees of Dartmouth College.

History
Dartmouth Broadcasting began in  the 1920s, over copper wires linking all the dorms, using the call letters WDBS (Dartmouth Broadcasting System), changing to WDCR (Dartmouth College Radio) when it became an officially licensed station of the Federal Communications Commission, its first official broadcast at 1340 AM in 1958.

WDCR's origins lie in a carrier-current station, WDBS, which was started on October 27, 1941 (after a month of test programming). During the 1950s, efforts were made to obtain a license from the Federal Communications Commission (FCC), which would allow for an expansion of the station's reach to the rest of the Upper Valley; at 9 p.m. on March 4, 1958, WDCR signed on.

The station left the air on August 22, 2008, due to damage to WDCR's ground system during a construction project near the station's transmitter location; soon afterward, the station announced that it had transitioned to being an Internet radio station, WebDCR.com (although this station's website still features WDCR's logo). The station nonetheless briefly returned to the air in August 2009 in order to maintain the broadcast license; in September 2010, Dartmouth College surrendered the license to the FCC for cancellation. By this point, interest in the AM station had declined due to a combination of its time off-the-air and Dartmouth's expansion of its radio operations (in addition to WebDCR, Dartmouth had established an FM radio station, WFRD, in 1976).

References

External links

 WebDCR.com
NECRAT's pictures of WDCR's green- & white-painted tower

DCR
Defunct radio stations in the United States
Radio stations established in 1958
Radio stations disestablished in 2010
Hanover, New Hampshire
Dartmouth College
1958 establishments in New Hampshire
2010 disestablishments in New Hampshire
Internet radio stations in the United States